All Dogs Go to Heaven: The Series is an American animated television series, which aired from 1996 to 1998 in syndication and on Fox Family from 1998 to 1999 with 40 half-hour episodes produced in total. Don Bluth's 1989 animated feature All Dogs Go to Heaven featured a disreputable mongrel (with a mixture of a German Shepherd) named Charlie who died, went to heaven, escaped back to Earth for vengeance on his murderer and then found redemption with the help of a young orphan girl named Anne-Marie. It spawned a 1996 sequel, All Dogs Go to Heaven 2. The series takes place after the second film.

Most of the voice actors from the films reprised their roles in the series, including Dom DeLuise, Ernest Borgnine, Charles Nelson Reilly, Bebe Neuwirth, Sheena Easton and Adam Wylie. Steven Weber provided the speaking and singing voices of Charlie B. Barkin, who was voiced in the films by Burt Reynolds and Charlie Sheen (and singing voice provided in the second film by Jesse Corti). A direct-to-video Christmas special An All Dogs Christmas Carol serves as the finale.

Plot 
Following the events of All Dogs Go to Heaven 2, Charlie and Itchy live in San Francisco as guardian angels. In each episode, Annabelle assigns them a task, and while they always try to do the right thing, they inevitably keep ending up thrust into the middle of awkward situations. Charlie's duplicitous enemy Carface and his sidekick, Killer – returning from the first film – also appear, as did Charlie's friends: the Irish Setter Sasha; the whippet angel Annabelle, and the human boy David. The series also introduces three new characters: Bess, an award-winning, purebred show dog and Itchy's romantic interest; Lance, a by-the-book Doberman Pinscher, whom Charlie is jealous of for his heroic acts; and Belladonna, Annabelle's demonic cousin.

Episodes

Voice cast 
 Steven Weber as Charles "Charlie" B. Barkin
 Dom DeLuise as Itchiford "Itchy Itchiford" Dachshund
 Bebe Neuwirth as Annabelle / Belladonna
 Sheena Easton as Sasha la Fleur
 Adam Wylie as David
 Ernest Borgnine as Carface Caruthers
 Charles Nelson Reilly as Killer
 Carlos Alazraqui as Otto
 Tress MacNeille as Winifred Bessamay "Bess" de Winkerville / Gerta
 Kevin Michael Richardson as Manfred
 Mark Benninghofen as Lance the Wonder Pup
 Jess Harnell and Steve Mackall as The Blueshounds
 April Winchell as Tiffany

Music 
Mark Watters wrote the show's score. Some episodes feature a song, which was more frequent in the first two seasons, and season 3 only has one. "The Perfect Dog" and "Take the Easy Way Out" earned the series two Daytime Emmy nominations for Outstanding Original Song.

Home media 
In the 1990s, several VHS compilations were released, each with two episodes. In 2006, two volumes were released by Sony Pictures Home Entertainment, each containing four episodes. The entire series is available for digital download on iTunes. In Spring 2011, the entire series became available on YouTube through MGM Digital Media.

In December 2013, TGG Direct released All Dogs Go to Heaven: The Series - Complete Series on region 1 DVD. The 7-disc set features all 40 episodes, alongside An All Dogs Christmas Carol.

See also
 List of films about angels

Notes

References

External links 

 

1990s American animated television series
1990s American sitcoms
1996 American television series debuts
1998 American television series endings
All Dogs Go to Heaven
American animated sitcoms
American children's animated adventure television series
American children's animated comedy television series
American children's animated fantasy television series
Angels in television
First-run syndicated television programs in the United States
Fox Family Channel original programming
Seven Network original programming
Animated television series about dogs
Toon Disney original programming
YTV (Canadian TV channel) original programming
Television series by MGM Television
Television shows set in San Francisco
American sequel television series
Animated television shows based on films
Heaven in popular culture
Television series by Claster Television
Television series by Metro-Goldwyn-Mayer Animation